WNRW (98.9 FM) - branded as 98.9 Kiss FM - is a Top 40 (CHR) radio station located in Prospect, Kentucky, serving the Louisville, Kentucky area. The station is licensed by the Federal Communications Commission (FCC) to broadcast on 98.9 FM with an ERP of 43,000 watts.  The station's studios are located in the Louisville enclave of Watterson Park and the transmitter site is in east Louisville southwest of the I-64/I-265 interchange. The station is owned by iHeartMedia, Inc.

Station history

WNRW signed on from Salem, Indiana as WSLM-FM in 1967. It was the second attempt by WSLM to launch an FM station, the first having been deleted in 1964.

98.9 Kiss FM, first incarnation

Prior to its flip to its current format in 2000 as "98.9 Kiss FM", the station's previous formats included classic country, Modern AC, and Hot AC. They are also a major competitor for longtime rival WDJX, but counters their broad-based direction with a Rhythmic-leaning playlist.

98.9 Radio Now, second incarnation of Kiss
 
WZKF moved its city of license from Salem, IN to Prospect, KY on April 26, 2010, and on July 12, 2010, WZKF rebranded from "98.9 Kiss FM" to "98.9 Radio Now". According to PD Mike Klein, "The name change and new look comes along with a signal upgrade and updated Top 40/Mainstream music mix with a rhythmic lean" and added that "The station is being re-branded with the 'NOW' moniker to give a fresh new approach delivering hit music to the people who need it 'NOW'.".  July 19, 2010 WZKF changed their call letters to WNRW.

On January 14, 2020, WNRW reverted to the Kiss FM branding, with no other major format changes.

WNRW-HD2
In 2008, WNRW's HD2 subcarrier began carrying the Dance Top 40 Club Phusion format. They have replaced it with Evolution in late 2012.  The HD2 subchannel has since been turned off.

References

External links
WNRW official website

NRW
Contemporary hit radio stations in the United States
Radio stations established in 1967
IHeartMedia radio stations